Fariya Hassan is a Pakistani actress and model. She is known for her roles in dramas Muqaddas, Shanakht, Maikay Ki Yaad Na Aaye, Ahsas, Tere Bina and Raqs-e-Bismil.

Early life
Fariya was born in 1993 on 17th December in Lahore, Pakistan. She completed her studies from University of Lahore.

Career
Fariya made her debut as an actress in 2014. She was noted for her roles in dramas Shanakht, Riffat Apa Ki Bahuein, Mol, Preet Na Kariyo Koi and Muqaddas. Then she appeared in dramas Maikay Ki Yaad Na Aaye, Laikin, Main Kaisy Kahun, Kahan Tum Chalay Gye, Diyar-e-Dil and Dekho Chaand Aaya. In 2019 she appeared in movie Talash as Tania with Noaman Sami and Ahmed Zeb. Since then she appeared in dramas Maryam Periera, Bari Phuppo, Tere Bina, Ahsas, Beqadar and Raqs-e-Bismil.

Filmography

Television

Telefilm

Film

References

External links
 
 
 
 

1993 births
Pakistani television actresses
Living people
21st-century Pakistani actresses
Pakistani film actresses